Bjarnar saga Hítdælakappa (The Saga of Björn, Champion of the Hitardal People, 'Björn's saga) is one of the sagas of Icelanders. The text is incomplete and can be found in two parchment manuscripts from the 14th century (AM 162, fol.) And two paper manuscripts of the 17th century (AM 551 d alfa 4to). 

Björn (Bjørn Hitdølakappe), a relative of Egill Skallagrímsson in Egil's Saga, grows up at Borg á Mýrum, the homestead that has passed from Egill to his son and grandson. The main plot of the saga, which takes place near Snæfellsnes between the years 1000 and 1025, and is about the disagreement between Björn and his rival Tord (Þórður skáld Kolbeinsson). Tord becomes friends with Björn in Norway. Tord promises to carry a marriage proposal from Björn to Oddny (Oddný Þorkelsdóttir), but he falsifies the message, spreads a rumour that Björn has died, and marries Oddny himself. The story ends after Björn's death as Tord is sentenced at the Thing (assembly).

Family relationship
Björn was born 989. His grandmother was Sæunn Skallagrímsdóttir, making him a great-nephew of the warrior-poet Egill Skallagrímsson. He was fostered at Borg á Mýrum and grew up with Egill's grandson Skule Torsteinsson (Skúli Þórsteinsson).

Analysis
The saga contains a number of erotic and satirical elements. It is notable for a passage that appears to describe a man being found to possess a woodcut depicting anal sex between two men.

Þess er nú við getið að hlutur sá fannst í hafnarmarki Þórðar er þvígit vinveittlegra þótti. Það voru karlar tveir og hafði annar hött blán á höfði. Þeir stóðu lútir og horfði annar eftir öðrum. Það þótti illur fundur og mæltu menn að hvorskis hlutur væri góður þeirra er þar stóðu og enn verri er fyrir stóð.

Translation:

Now it is mentioned that an item was found among the possessions that Tord left behind at the shore, an item that was no more friendly. It was two men, and one wore a blue hat on his head. They were leaning over and one was looking over from behind the other. This was considered a terrible find and all were agreed that both parties seen standing there were in a bad position, but the one in front a much worse position still.

Explanatory notes

References

bibliography

External links

Full text in Icelandic at the Icelandic Saga Database
Proverbs in Bjarnar saga hítdœlakappa

Sagas of Icelanders
Medieval LGBT history